is a town located in Rumoi Subprefecture, Hokkaido, Japan.

As of September 2016, the town has an estimated population of 4,634 and a density of 13 persons per km2. The total area is 369.64 km2.

Mashike's main distinction is the sake brewery Kunimare, which is well known throughout Hokkaido. Mashike also has several fruit farms, and it is easy to buy directly from the farmers.

Mashike has a small ski resort with only two lifts, although it is the biggest one in Rumoi District. Driving further up into the mountains from the ski resort is Shokanbetsu-Teuri-Yagishiri Quasi-National Park and Mt. Shokanbetsu (1491 meters). Camping facilities are available in the park.

Climate

Mascot

Mashike's mascot is  who is a shy sailor seagull. He is known to protect anyone (especially children). His get his energy from eating shrimp, cherries, apples and sake. His charm point is his eyes which allows him to sense any incoming danger. He is unveiled on July 1, 1990.

References

External links

Official Website 

Towns in Hokkaido